Karen Archey is an American art critic and curator based in New York City and Amsterdam. She is the former editor of e-flux Conversations and current Curator of Contemporary Art for Time-Based Media at Stedelijk Museum in Amsterdam.

Archey regularly speaks on issues related to contemporary art, feminism, and technology at venues such as the Museum of Modern Art in New York City and the Institute of Contemporary Arts in London. She has written for publications such as Art in America, ArtReview, frieze, and Spike Art Quarterly, and she has contributed essays to publications of the Whitney Museum of American Art, New York and New Museum of Contemporary Art, New York.

Biography
Archey received a Bachelor of Fine Arts in Visual and Critical Studies in 2008 from The School of the Art Institute of Chicago, Chicago, IL.

Archey was the Curator-in-Residence at the Abrons Arts Center in New York from 2012 to 2013. She also served as the Editor-at-Large of Rhizome at the New Museum of Contemporary Art, New York. She contributed the essay Bodies in Space: Gender and Sexuality in the Online Public Sphere to the 2015 publication Mass Effect: Art and the Internet in the Twenty-First Century, co-published by the MIT Press and New Museum as part of the series Critical Anthologies in Art and Culture.

In 2014 in Beijing, Archey co-curated the survey exhibition Art Post-Internet at Ullens Center for Contemporary Art with Robin Peckham and edited the freely available publication Art Post-internet: Information/Data.

Archey joined e-flux in 2014 and launched the platform Conversations. She remained the editor of Conversations until 2017.

She has contributed reviews to numerous contemporary arts publications, such as ArtReview and Art-Agenda. In 2015, Archey received a Creative Capital grant from the Andy Warhol Foundation for the Visual Arts for short-form writing.

In 2017, Archey was appointed the Curator of Contemporary Art for Time-Based Media of Stedelijk Museum.

Exhibitions

 Images Rendered Bare. Vacant. Recognizable, Stadium, New York City, 2012
 Bcc #7, Stadium, New York City, 2012
 Deleuze & Co., Stadium, New York City, 2012
 How to Eclipse the Light, Wilkinson, London, 2012
 Deep Spaces (Insides), Joe Sheftel Gallery, New York City, 2012
 Harm van den Dorpel, Abrons Art Center, New York City, 2013
 Hymns for Mr. Suzuki, Abrons Art Center, New York City, 2013
 Art Post-Internet, Ullens Center for Contemporary Art, Beijing, China, 2014
 Sharing Love, Institute of Contemporary Art at Maine College of Art, Portland, 2016

Selected writings
 Embodied Differences: New Images of the Monstrous and Cyborg in Contemporary Art, within Dreamlands: Immersive Cinema and Art, 1905–2016, edited by Chrissie Isles; Whitney Museum of American Art, 2016
 Bodies in Space: Gender and Sexuality in the Online Public Sphere, within Mass Effect: Art and the Internet in the Twenty-First Century, edited by Lauren Cornell and Ed Halter; MIT Press and New Museum, 2015
 Art Post-Internet: Information/Data, edited with Robin Peckham, 2014
 "Hyper-Elasticity Symptoms, Signs Treatment: On Hito Steyerl's Liquidity Inc." within Too Much World: The Films of Hito Steyerl, edited by Nick Aikens; Sternberg Press, Van Abbemuseum and Institute of Modern Art, 2014
 Hack Life, Art Papers, November/December 2013

References

Year of birth missing (living people)
Living people
American art critics
American art curators
American women curators
Journalists from Ohio
School of the Art Institute of Chicago alumni
People from Medina County, Ohio
21st-century American women